Taiyuan (Mandarin pronunciation: ; also known as , ) is the capital and largest city of Shanxi Province, People's Republic of China. Taiyuan is the political, economic, cultural and international exchange center of Shanxi Province. It is an industrial base focusing on energy and heavy chemicals. Throughout its long history, Taiyuan was the capital or provisional capital of many dynasties in China, hence the name .

As of 2021, the city will govern 6 districts, 3 counties, and host a county-level city with a total area of 6,988 square kilometers and a permanent population of 5,390,957.

Taiyuan is located roughly in the centre of Shanxi, with the Fen River flowing through the central city.

Taiyuan belongs to the warm temperate continental monsoon climate, with long, dry and cold winters, hot and humid summers, short and windy spring and autumn, and distinct dry and wet seasons.

Etymology and names

History
Taiyuan is an ancient city with more than 2500 years of urban history, dating back from 497 BC. It was the capital or secondary capital of Zhao, Former Qin, Eastern Wei, Northern Qi, Northern Jin, Later Tang, Later Jin, Later Han, Northern Han. Its strategic location and rich history make Taiyuan one of the economic, political, military, and cultural centers of Northern China.

Pre-Qin dynasty history
From about 859 BC the area around modern-day Taiyuan was occupied by the Rong people. In 662 BC the Rong were driven out by the Di people.

During the Spring and Autumn period, the state of Jin emerged to the south of Taiyuan. In 541 BC, the Jin army led by General, drove out the Di Tribes, and Taiyuan became part of the state of Jin. 

During the Battle of Jinyang in 453 BC, Zhi Yao diverted the flow of the Fen River to inundate the city of Jinyang, caused significant damage to the Zhao. Later, Zhao Xiangzi alerted Wei and Han, who both decided to ally with Zhao. On the night of 8 May 453 BC, Zhao troops broke the dams of the Fen River and let the river flood the Zhi armies, and eventually annihilated the Zhi army, with the help from Wei and Han.

The Tripartition of Jin happened in 403 BC, when the state of Jin, then a strong power in Northern China, was divided into three smaller states of Han, Zhao and Wei. This event is the watershed between the Spring and Autumn and Warring States periods in Chinese history. Jinyang, was chosen as the capital of Zhao, by Zhao Ji. Later, the capital of Zhao was moved to Handan in modern Hebei.

Qin dynasty
In 248 BC, the state of Qin attacked Zhao under General Meng'ao, and obtained the area around Jinyang from Zhao. Qin set up the Commandery of Taiyuan, with the city of Jinyang as its administrative center. Although, the name Taiyuan had appeared in historic records before, potentially referring to different regions in nowadays southern and central Shanxi, this was the first time Taiyuan was officially used to refer to present-day Taiyuan.

In 246 BC, there was an uprising in Jinyang, and it was quickly quelled by Meng'ao. 

In 221 BC, Qin conquered the rest of China, and officially started the first imperial dynasty of China. Qin established thirty-six commanderies on its territory, and Taiyuan was one of them. Also, the capital of commandery of Taiyuan was Jinyang.

Han dynasty and Three Kingdoms
In 206 BC, Emperor Gaozu Liu Bang established the Han dynasty. During that period, the Qin administrative system of commanderies was abolished, the two Commanderies of Taiyuan and Yanmen were combined as the vassal state of Han under the rule of King Xin of Han. 

Later, King Xin of Han moved the capital from Jinyang to Mayi (present-day Shuozhou) with the approval from the emperor Gaozu. However, King Xin of Han conspired with the Xiongnu against Gaozu, and attacked Han for many years. In 196 BC, King Xin of Han was killed after he lost a battle. And the vassal state of Han was replaced by the vassal state of Dai, with Jinyang as the administrative center of Dai.

During the tumultuous Three Kingdoms, the population of Taiyuan decreased significantly due to constant warfares. Taiyuan was ruled by Gongsun Zan, Yuan Shao, and then by Cao Cao, and was part of Cao Wei afterwards.

Jin dynasty and Sixteen Kingdoms
During the Jin dynasty, Taiyuan was again changed into a vassal state. Following the ending of the Jin dynasty, ethnic minority peoples settled a series of short-lived sovereign states in northern China, commonly referred to as Sixteen Kingdoms. Taiyuan was part of Former Zhao, Later Zhao, Former Qin, Former Yan, Former Qin again, Western Yan, and Later Yan chronologically.

In 304, Liu Yuan founded the Xiongnu state of Former Zhao, whose army raided the area around Taiyuan for years and eventually obtained Taiyuan in 316. In 319, Taiyuan became part of Later Zhao, founded by Shi Le. Later, Taiyuan was obtained by Former Yan in 358, and by Former Qin in 370. Former Qin was founded by Fu Jian in 351 with capital of Chang'an. 

Fu Jian died in 384. His son Fu Pi declared himself an emperor in 385, with Jinyang (central city of Taiyuan) as the capital. But the next year, Fu Pi was defeated by the Western Yan prince Murong Yong in 386, and Taiyuan became part of Western Yan. In 394, Taiyuan was conquered by Later Yan army.

Southern and Northern Dynasties

In 386, Tuoba Gui founded Northern Wei. In 396, Northern Wei expanded to Taiyuan.

In 543, Eastern Wei was founded by Gao Huan, with the capital at the city of Ye, and Taiyuan as the alternative capital, where the Mansion of the "Great Chancellor" Gao Huan was located.

In 550, Northern Qi was founded by Gao Yang, who maintained his father Gao Huan's choice of Taiyuan as the alternative capital. The Buddhist Tianlongshan Grottoes of Taiyuan started during this period, and continued for many centuries afterwards. 

In 577, Taiyuan was conquered and became part of Northern Zhou.

Sui dynasty

In 581, Emperor Wen of Sui founded Sui dynasty. Jinyang was first the administrative center of Bing Zhou, which was changed into Taiyuan Commandery.
In 617, Li Yuan rose in rebellion based in Taiyuan, and expanded quickly.

Tang dynasty
In 618, Li Yuan founded Tang dynasty, which is generally considered a golden age of Chinese civilization. Taiyuan expanded significantly during the Tang dynasty, partly because Taiyuan was the military base of the founding emperors Li Yuan and Li Shimin. As Li Shimin wrote in 619: "Taiyuan, the base of the imperial regime and the foundation of the state."

In 690, Wu Zetian set Taiyuan as the Northern Capital,, one of the three capitals, along with Chang'an and Luoyang, as depicted in the poem by  : "The king of the heaven has three capitals, the Northern capital is one of them." (""). In 742 AD, Emperor Xuanzong of Tang changed its name further to Beijing. During Tang Dynasty, the title Northern Capital to Taiyuan had been endowed or abolished multiple times.

Five Dynasties and Ten Kingdoms
In 923, Li Cunxu, son of Li Keyong, founded Later Tang with capital of Daming, and soon conquered most of North China, and ended Later Liang. Afterwards, Li Cunxu moved the capital from Daming to Luoyang, and Taiyuan was set as a provisional capital, titled "Beidu" (北都, literally 'Northern Capital').

In 936, Shi Jingtang established Later Jin in Taiyuan with the help from Khitan Liao dynasty. The next year, Shi Jingtang moved the capital from Taiyuan to Luoyang, and then to Kaifeng, and Taiyuan became a provisional northern capital ("Beijing") again.

Song dynasty

Zhao Kuangyin (Emperor Taizu of Song ) established the Song dynasty and embarked on the campaign of re-unification of China. Using a power struggle at the Northern Han court Taizu moved against it in the late 968.  By early 969 his armies encircled Taiyuan and defeated the reinforcements sent by the Khitan. However, an attempt to flood the city failed. The siege was lifted after three months, as heavy rains caused diseases in the besieging army, the supplies were running low, and another Khitan relief force was advancing towards the city.

Taizu launched the second invasion of Northern Han
in September 969, but the armies were recalled after his death (November 14,969).

Taizu's brother Taizong subjugated the last independent kingdoms in the south of China by 978, and in 979 launched the third campaign
against the Northern Han and its overlord the Khitan state of Liao. Using the north-western route instead of the southern (used in the previous campaigns) the armies of Taizong  defeated a
major Liao force. Isolated, the Northern Han resisted for only
fifteen days before surrendering.  In contrast to the mild policies of his brother, Taizong dealt harshly with the city. He ordered the flooding of Taiyuan by releasing the Fen River, and set the city on fire.  The former capital was downgraded from prefecture to county town status.

It was not until 982 that a new city was founded on the banks of the Fen River. The oldest existing building in Taiyuan today is the Temple of the Goddess inside the Jin Ci Complex. It was originally built in 1023 and reconstructed in 1102.

From 1027 one of the two private markets for Tangut goods, particularly salt, operated in Taiyuan. During the Song period many people, including the family of chancellor Wang Anshi,  migrated south.

Jin dynasty
The Jurchen Jin dynasty was founded in 1115, and in 1125, Taiyuan was conquered by Jin.

Yuan dynasty
The Mongol empire emerged in 1206 under the leadership of Genghis Khan, and it expanded quickly. In 1218, Taiyuan was conquered by the Mongol army led by General Muqali.
Kublai Khan established the Yuan dynasty in 1271, and the administrative area of Taiyuan Lu was expanded.

The Taoist Longshan Grottoes was built in early Yuan dynasty, initiated by Taoist monk Song Defang.

Ming dynasty
In 1368, Hongwu Emperor established the Ming dynasty, and Taiyuan was obtained from Yuan, by General Xu Da.

The Ming dynasty installed Nine Military Garrisons to defend the northern territory during the reign of the Hongzhi Emperor, which included the Garrison of Taiyuan.

Shanxi merchants became prominent in Chinese business history since the beginning of Ming dynasty, thanks to the logistic requirements of the military around the borders of northern Shanxi to defend Ming against the remnant Mongol Northern Yuan dynasty.

In the ending period of Ming dynasty, the rebel leader Li Zicheng conquered Taiyuan, and Taiyuan became part of Great Shun temporarily in 1644.

Qing dynasty
In 1644, Shunzhi founded the Qing dynasty and defeated the Great Shun Army in Taiyuan in the same year.

Throughout the Qing dynasty, the international trade with Russia, especially of tea, and the creation and development of so-called draft banks, or Piaohao, boosted the central Shanxi basin to become the financial center of Qing China. Even though most of these Piaohao were based in different neighboring counties of Qi County, Taigu, and Yuci, Taiyuan became a significant trading center, due to its political and economical status in Shanxi.

In 1900, the Taiyuan Massacre occurred, during which a number of Western missionaries were killed.

Republic of China
The warlord Yan Xishan retained control of Shanxi from the Xinhai Revolution in 1911 to the end of the Chinese Civil War in 1949. Taiyuan consequently flourished as the center of his comparatively progressive province and experienced extensive industrial development. It was linked by rail both to the far southwest of Shanxi and to Datong in the north. Until the end of the Chinese Civil War in 1949, Yan's arsenal in Taiyuan was the only factory in China sufficiently advanced to produce field artillery. Because Yan succeeded in keeping Shanxi uninvolved in most of the major battles between rival warlords that occurred in China during the 1910s and 1920s, Taiyuan was never taken from Yan by an invading army until the Japanese conquered it in 1937.

Yan was aware of the threat posed by the Japanese; and, in order to defend against the impending Japanese invasion of Shanxi, Yan entered into a secret "united front" agreement with the Communists in November 1936. After concluding his alliance with the Communists, he allowed agents under Zhou Enlai to establish a secret headquarters in Taiyuan. Yan, under the slogan "resistance against the enemy and defense of the soil", attempted to recruit young patriotic intellectuals to his government from across China. By 1936 Taiyuan became a gathering point for anti-Japanese intellectuals who had fled from Beijing, Tianjin, and Northeast China. A representative of the Japanese army, speaking of the final defense of Taiyuan, said that "nowhere in China have the Chinese fought so obstinately".

From the Japanese occupation of Taiyuan to the Japanese surrender in 1945, the Japanese continued to exploit Taiyuan's industries and resources to supply the Japanese army. After the Japanese army in Shanxi surrendered to Yan Xishan, 10,000–15,000 Japanese troops, including both enlisted men and officers, decided to fight for Yan rather than return to Japan. Yan also retained the services of experienced and foreign-educated Japanese technicians and professional staff brought into Taiyuan by the Japanese to run the complex of industries that they had developed around Taiyuan.

Taiyuan was the last area in Shanxi to resist Communist control during the final stages of the Chinese Civil War. The city was taken by the Communists on 22 April 1949, after they surrounded Taiyuan and cut it off from all means of land and air supply, and taking the city required the support of 1,300 pieces of artillery. Many Nationalist officers committed suicide when the city fell to a Communist army.

Geography

Taiyuan lies on the Fen River in the north of its fertile upper basin. It commands the north–south route through the province, as well as important natural lines of transportation through the Taihang Mountains to Hebei in the east and to northern Shaanxi in the west.

Natural resources
Taiyuan is abundant in natural resources such as coal, iron, marble, silica, bauxite, limestone, graphite, quartz, phosphorus, gypsum, mica, copper, and gold. It boasts high production of coal, iron, silica and marble. The western satellite city of Gujiao is the largest production site of metallurgical coal in China. The tree population in Taiyuan is dominated by coniferous forest, pine, white pine, spruce, and cypress.

Climate
Taiyuan experiences a cold semi-arid climate (Köppen climate classification BSk). Taiyuan has a temperate monsoon climate. Spring is dry, with occasional dust storms, followed by early summer heat waves. Summer tends to be warm to hot with most of the year's rainfall concentrated in July and August. Winter is long and cold, but dry and sunny. Because of the aridity, there tends to be considerable diurnal variation in temperature, except during the summer. The weather is much cooler than comparable-latitude cities, such as Shijiazhuang, due to the moderately high altitude. With monthly percent possible sunshine ranging from 51 percent in July to 61 percent in May, there are 2,502 hours of sunshine annually.

Environment
The forest area coverage rate in the six urban districts has been increased to 21.69% in 2015.

Air pollution
Taiyuan had suffered from severe air pollution, especially in the 1990s, and the first decade of the 21st century, and once it was even listed among the ten most air-polluted cities in the world.  Recently, the air quality has been gradually improved with increasing public awareness of air quality control and stricter and more detailed rules for pollution applied. However, according to the 2014 statistical book issued by the National Bureau of Statistics, even though no longer among the worst polluted cities in China, Taiyuan still has below-average ambient air quality, compared with other major Chinese cities. A 2019 study estimated that in 2016, there were 228,000 households in the city burning coal, burning a total of 1,096,000 tons that year alone. The authors of the study suggested that the local government should do more to transition from coal energy to gas energy, provide more electrical heating infrastructure, and transition to more renewable energy sources. In recent years, the city has taken further action to combat air pollution, creating a "coal-free zone" of 1,460 km2 in 2017. This zone prevents most people and organizations from buying, selling, storing, transporting, burning, or using coal. In 2019, the Taiyuan City Government expanded the size of this zone slightly, to a total of 1,574 km2.

Administrative divisions

Demographics

Economy

Consistent with China's economic expansion throughout the 2010s, Taiyuan's economy has shown consistent growth in recent years. In 2018, Taiyuan's GDP was worth 388.450 billion Yuan, more than double what it was in 2010. Disposable income per capita was reported to be 31,031 Yuan in 2018, a 7.2% increase from 2017. In 2015, Taiyuan imported 4,085.130 million USD worth of goods, and exported 6,592.250 million USD worth. Taiyuan's primary, secondary, and tertiary industries were worth 3.9 billion yuan, 105.2 billion yuan, and 132.2 billion yuan respectively in 2007. Shanxi produces a quarter of China's coal, and Taiyuan is the location of the China Taiyuan Coal Transaction Center, which began trading in 2012.

Transportation
Taiyuan is one of the transportation hubs in North China, with highways linking neighboring provincial capitals, and airlines to most other major Chinese cities and some international cities.

Public Transportation

The Taiyuan Metro is still under construction. Line 1 is set to open in 2024, while Line 2 has been operating since 26 December 2020. 

In early 2016 the city began the conversion of all its 8000 taxi fleet into purely electric vehicles, initially using BYD Auto model E6.

Air

The primary airport of the city is Taiyuan Wusu International Airport. It has been expanded for the landing of Airbus A380. The airport has domestic airlines to major cities including Beijing, Shanghai, and coastal cities such as Dalian. International flights to Taipei and Da Nang are available.

Highway
Taiyuan has a number of major roads, Including the G5, G20 (including Shitai Expressway), G55, G2001 (Ring Highway around Taiyuan), G307, G108, G208. 
A 45-kilometer Middle Ring Highway circles the metropolis of Taiyuan.
Two highways on the banks of Fen River run through the center of the city.
Nine Riverside highways along the nine branches of Fen River, including the Southern Shahe river, Northern Shahe river, etc., comprise an expressway system, connecting the central Fen River bank with surrounding areas of urban Taiyuan.
The southern part of Taiyuan has three "East-West" direction highways: South Middle Ring Street, Huazhang Street and Yingbin Road, and five "North-South" direction highways: West Middle Ring Road, Binhe West Road, Binhe East Road, Dayun Road, Jianshe Road  & Taiyu Road.
The western S56 Taiyuan-Gujiao Highway links Taiyuan with the western satellite city of Gujiao, and further connects Loufan.
The northern Yangxing Highway connects downtown Taiyuan with the northern suburb of Yangqu County.

Railway

Taiyuan is one of the main national hubs for the high-speed railway system of Northern China. Major high-speed railways passing Taiyuan, including the Shijiazhuang–Taiyuan high-speed railway and Datong–Xi'an high-speed railway.
The main high-speed railway station is Taiyuan South railway station. The conventional-speed Taiyuan–Zhongwei–Yinchuan railway, opened in 2011, provides a direct connection with western Shanxi, northern Shaanxi, Ningxia, and points further west.

Food

Taiyuan's local specialities include: 

 Tomato egg noodles
 Tijian
 Dao Xiao noodles
 Tounao: Contains mutton, rice wine and vegetables in the soup. This dish was first created by Chinese polymath Fu Shan, who was proficient in medicine, for his old and illness-ridden mother as a food substitute for the ancient medicine Bazhen Tang (literally "Soup of Eight Treasures") using only locally available food materials that have similar effects as the original medicine.
 Lao Chen Cu mature vinegar
 Yuci Flour Sausage
 Fried Pork with vegetables
 Mutton Soup

Sports
The Shanxi Brave Dragons of the Chinese Basketball Association play at Riverside Sports Arena.  The football club Shanxi Metropolis, currently playing in China League Two, plays in the Shanxi Sports Centre Stadium.

Tourism

Taiyuan is a modern city with just a few historic buildings remaining in the centre. The remnants of old Taiyuan can be found west of the central station, north of Fudong Street and close to Wuyi Road.

One of the main tourist destinations is Shanxi Museum located in West Binhe Road, downtown Taiyuan, which is among the largest museums in China.

The Twin Towers in Yongzuo Temple, which are featured in the emblem of the city, have been regarded as a symbol of Taiyuan for a long time. Yongzuo Temple is at southeast of the city centre, also famous for its peony garden and martyrs cemetery.

The Chongshan Monastery, Longtan Park, and Yingze Park (just off Yingze Street), in the city centre, are popular tourist destinations.

Jinci Temple also called Tangshuyu Temple, located in Jinyuan District of southern Taiyuan, dates back to the Zhou Dynasty. In Jinci, there are three treasures: the Nanlao Spring, the Beauty Status and the Queen status. The Flying Bridge Across the Fish Pond was built during the Song Dynasty, which is famous for its cross-shaped structure.

Along the West Mountain range in western Taiyuan, tourists can find Tianlongshan Grottoes, which were gradually built over many centuries, from the northern Qi dynasty, and contains thousands of Buddhist statues and artwork. The grottoes exist today in a damaged state with many of the sculptures now missing, that visitors to the caves cannot imagine how they looked in the past. Many of the sculptures from the caves are now in museums around the world. However, though the sculptures may be preserved and displayed, visitors to museums cannot understand them in their original historical, spatial, and religious contexts. Researchers at the University of Chicago initiated the Tianlongshan Caves Project in 2013 to pursue research and digital imaging of the caves and their sculptures.

Not far from the Tianlongshan Grottoes are the Longshan Grottoes, which is the only Taoist grottoes site in China. The main eight grottoes were carved in 1234~1239 during the Yuan Dynasty.

Education and research
Taiyuan is a major city for research appearing among the top 200 cities in the world by scientific research outputs as of 2022, as tracked by the Nature Index and home to Taiyuan University of Technology, the national key university in China and other public universities including Shanxi University, Taiyuan University of Science and Technology and North University of China.

Colleges and universities
 Taiyuan University of Technology
 Shanxi University
 North University of China
 Shanxi Medical University
 Taiyuan University of Science and Technology
 Taiyuan Normal University
 Shanxi University of Finance and Economics
 Shanxi College of Traditional Chinese Medicine

Major high schools
 The Affiliated High School of Shanxi University
 Taiyuan No. 5 Secondary School
 Shanxi Experimental Secondary School
 Taiyuan Foreign Language School
 Shanxi Modern Bilingual School
 Taiyuan Chengcheng Secondary School
 Taiyuan No. 12 Secondary School

International relations
Taiyuan has a friendship pairing with the following cities:

  Launceston, Tasmania, Australia (Established relations on 28 November 1995)
  Douala, Cameroon (Established relations on 12 October 1999)
  Chemnitz, Saxony, Germany (Established relations on 17 May 1995)
  Saint-Denis, Réunion, France (Established relations formally on 2 March 2012)
  Himeji, Hyōgo, Japan (Established relations on 19 May 1987)
  Saratov and Syktyvkar, Russia (Established relations on 8 December 1995 and 1 September 1994)
  Khujand, Tajikistan (Established relations on 31 August 2017)
  Donetsk, Ukraine (Established relations formally on 25 August 2012)
  Nashville, Tennessee, United States (Established relations on 18 April 2007)

See also
 Taiyuan Satellite Launch Center

References

External links

 Taiyuan Government website

 
Cities in Shanxi
Populated places established in the 1st millennium BC
Provincial capitals in China